Indore is an unincorporated community in Clay County, West Virginia, United States. Indore has a post office with ZIP code 25111.

The community derives its name from Endor, a place mentioned in the Hebrew Bible.

References

Unincorporated communities in Clay County, West Virginia
Unincorporated communities in West Virginia